Colker is a surname. Notable people with the surname include:

Carlon Colker (born 1965), American physician
Deborah Colker (born 1960), Brazilian writer, director, dancer, and choreographer
Ruth Colker, American lawyer

See also
Colfer
Coller